Krupski is a Slavic surname.

Krupski may also refer to:
 Krupski Młyn, a village
 Gmina Krupski Młyn, an administrative district

See also
Aleksandr Krupskiy (born 1960), Russian sportsman
Illya Krupskyi (born 2004), Ukrainian football player

es:Krupski